Corylobium is a genus of true bugs belonging to the family Aphididae.

The species of this genus are found in Europe.

Species:
 Corylobium avellanae (Schrank, 1801)

References

Aphididae